The Kilburn Dam, an earth-fill type dam and part of the Tugela-Vaal Water Project and Drakensberg Pumped Storage Scheme, is located  lower than the Sterkfontein Dam, on the Mnjaneni River, near Bergville, KwaZulu-Natal, province of South Africa. The main purpose of the dam assembly is to serve for the generation of hydro-electricity and its hazard potential has been ranked high (3).

See also 

 List of reservoirs and dams in South Africa
 List of rivers of South Africa

References 

Dams completed in 1981
Energy infrastructure completed in 1981
Dams in South Africa
Hydroelectric power stations in South Africa
1981 establishments in South Africa
20th-century architecture in South Africa